Portuguese is the only official language of Angola, but 46 other languages are spoken in the country, mostly Bantu languages. Six of these have the benefit of an institutional status in Angola: Umbundu,  Kimbundu, Kikongo, Chokwe, Ngangela and Kwanyama.

European languages
Portuguese is the sole official language. Due to cultural, social and political mechanisms which date back to the colonial history, the number of native Portuguese speakers is large and growing. A 2012 study by the Angolan National Institute for Statistics found that Portuguese is the mother tongue of 39% of the population. It is spoken as a second language by many more throughout the country, and younger urban generations are moving towards the dominant or exclusive use of Portuguese. The 2014 population census found that about 71% of the nearly 25.8 million inhabitants of Angola speak Portuguese at home.

In urban areas, 85% of the population declared to speak Portuguese at home in the 2014 census, against 49% in rural areas. Portuguese was quickly adopted by Angolans in the mid-twentieth century as a lingua franca among the various ethnic groups. After the Angolan Civil War, many people moved to the cities where they learned Portuguese. When they returned to the countryside, more people were speaking Portuguese as a first language. The variant of the Portuguese language used in Angola is known as Angolan Portuguese. Phonetically, this variant is very similar to the Mozambican variant with some exceptions. Some believe that Angolan Portuguese resembles a pidgin in some aspects.

However, in Cabinda, wedged between two French-speaking countries — the DRC and the Congo — many people speak French as well as, or better than, Portuguese. In fact, of the literate population, 90 percent speak French while 10 percent speak Portuguese. Also, the Angolan Bakongo who were exiled in the Democratic Republic of the Congo usually speak better French and Lingala than Portuguese and Kikongo.

African languages

All native languages of Angola are considered to be national languages. After independence, the government said it would choose six to be developed as literary languages. The six languages vary between government pronouncements, but commonly included are 
Umbundu, Kimbundu, Kikongo (presumably the Fiote of Cabinda), Chokwe, Kwanyama (Ovambo), and Mbunda (never clearly defined; may be Nyemba, Luchazi, or indeterminate). Angolan radio transmits in fourteen of the "main" national languages: Bangala ('Mbangala'), Chokwe, Fiote, Herero ('Helelo'), Kikongo, Kimbundu, Kwanyama, Lunda, Ngangela, Ngoya, Nyaneka, Ovambo ('Oxiwambo'), Songo, Umbundu. Some of the national languages are used in Angolan schools, including the provision of teaching materials such as books, but there is a shortage of teachers.

Umbundu is the most widely spoken Bantu language, spoken natively by about 23 percent of the population, about 5.9 million. It is mainly spoken in the center and south of the country. Kimbundu is spoken in Luanda Province and adjacent provinces. Kikongo is spoken in the northwest, including the exclave of Cabinda. About 8.24% of Angolans use Kikongo. Fiote is spoken by about 2.9%, mainly in Cabinda. Lingala is also spoken in Angola.

The San people speak languages from two families, the !Kung and Khoe, though only a few hundred speak the latter. The majority of San fled to South Africa after the end of the civil war. The extinct Kwadi language may have been distantly related to Khoe, and Kwisi is entirely unknown; their speakers were neither Khoisan nor Bantu.

Asian languages
A (very small) number of Angolans of Lebanese descent speak Arabic and/or French. Due to increasing Angola-China relations, there is now a sinophone community of about 300,000.

Romani is spoken by the Roma minority in Angola. The Roma were deported to Angola from Portugal.

List of Languages of Angola 
Listed below are the languages of Angola.

Foreign languages
The most popular foreign languages taught at school are English and French. The Angolan Government has planned to make English a compulsory subject in the future.

See also
Angolan Portuguese

Notes

References

External links
Tola Akindipe, Geofrey Kakaula & Alcino Joné, Largest Chokwe language resource on the internet (Mofeko)
Tola Akindipe, André Tati. Largest Ibinda (Fiote) language resource on the web (Mofeko)
PanAfrican L10n page on Angola
L'aménagement linguistique dans le monde – Angola
Ethnologue Listing of Angolan Languages
endangeredlanguages.com